522nd or 522d may refer to:

522d Special Operations Squadron (522 SOS), the Fireballs, a unit of the United States Air Force

See also
522 (number)
522, the year 522 (DXXII) of the Julian calendar
522 BC